Rhythm Heaven, known as Rhythm Paradise in Europe and Rhythm World in Korea, is a Japanese rhythm video game developed by Nintendo SPD for the Nintendo DS. It is the second game in Nintendo's Rhythm Heaven series and the first one released worldwide, following the Japan-only Game Boy Advance title Rhythm Tengoku, and was succeeded by Rhythm Heaven Fever for the Wii and Rhythm Heaven Megamix for the Nintendo 3DS. The game was released in Japan on July 31, 2008, in North America on April 5, 2009, in Europe on May 1, 2009, and in Australia on June 4, 2009.

Gameplay
Unlike its predecessor which is played using the GBA's buttons, Rhythm Heaven is played using the touch screen with the DS held vertically, similarly to a book. Throughout the game, players use the stylus to play through several rhythm-based levels known as Rhythm Games, each with their own specific rules. Controls used include tapping the touch screen, holding the stylus down on the touch screen, dragging it across the screen and flicking it off the screen. A guitar-based minigame late in the game known as Rockers 2, along with the unlockable guitar lessons, also include the use of the DS's shoulder buttons to bend guitar notes.

The game's fifty Rhythm Games are split into ten sets, each consisting of four Rhythm Games and a themed Remix level that incorporates the previous games (or more) into one song. In each Rhythm Game, the player must attempt to keep with the rhythm throughout the level. Several Rhythm Games have sequel levels in later sets which use the same mechanics as their predecessors but have increased difficulty and, in a few cases, introduce new patterns. Most levels allow the player to practice before attempting to clear the game, the exceptions being the Remix stages and some sequel games (namely those that include previously unseen patterns).

The player is given a rank at the end of a game depending on how well they did, which ranges from 'Try Again' for a poor performance, to 'Superb' if they complete the stage with few or no misses. To clear a Rhythm Game and progress onto the next level, the player needs to get a 'Just OK' or 'OK' rank. By receiving a 'Superb' rank on each Rhythm Game, players receive Medals which unlock bonus content, such as Endless Games, Rhythm Toys and Guitar Lessons. Sometimes, a Rhythm Game that a player has received a Superb rating on may be randomly selected for a Perfect attempt. Only appearing on the menu three times before moving elsewhere, these runs require the player to complete a Rhythm Game perfectly without making any mistakes. Completing a Perfect run earns more bonus features in the cafe, such as song sheets and lyrics.

While the game is automatically set to be played on right-handed mode, there is also a left-handed mode for left-handed individuals.

Music
Rhythm Heaven uses original music composed by Tsunku and Masami Yone, with vocals by TNX artists including Canary Club, The Possible, and Tsunku himself (credited as Occhama). These vocals were re-recorded in English for the Western version by other vocalists (most notably Ayaka Nagate, a former member of the Tsunku-produced Coconuts Musume), as were some of the voice cues. There were plans to include the Japanese songs in the music player section, but they were soon taken out due to space restrictions. Soundtrack albums for the game have been released in Japan, but not in North America.
The European version has been fully translated in Spanish, English, French, German, and Italian language, including the vocal songs in the Fan Club, The Dazzles, Frog Hop, Karate Man, and Airboarder Rhythm Games.

Development
Rhythm Heaven was developed by Nintendo SP&D1 with the assistance of Tsunku, a music record producer, both also worked on the original Rhythm Tengoku. The conception of the game is credited to Nintendo programmer Kazuyoshi Osawa who previously worked on Metroid and WarioWare titles.

The game's development "wasn't easy" for the staff. Osawa didn't like the idea of using buttons, so he considered a control mechanic that involved the Touch Screen. The ability to touch the edge of the Touch Screen was considered, but was determined to be too difficult.

The Flick action took the staff a "little getting used to" as they had to make it feel "fair" to the player until they realised that if flicking was combined with the music it would give the players a "good sense of timing". The Flick action took them about "two to three months" to research and "six months" to eventually adapt the control into the game. Tsunku really liked the idea of the Flick action regardless of the long time to adapt. At that time, he thought of the idea for Frog Hop, which became one of the first games to be made for Rhythm Heaven. Not unlike many other games, there are various differences across regions when the game (and its following sequels) was releasing worldwide.

Reception

The game received "favorable" reviews according to the review aggregation website Metacritic. In Japan, Famitsu gave it a score of two eights and two nines, for a total of 34 out of 40.

411Mania gave it a score of nine out of ten and called it "a must-own that won't disappoint." Wired gave it a similar score of nine stars out of ten and called it "the sort of novel, deep, challenging game that people accuse Nintendo of not creating anymore." The Daily Telegraph gave it eight out of ten and said that the touches "elevate [the game] from a fun but throwaway music game into an addictive quest for rhythm perfection. It's not a music game as wonderfully elaborate as the superb Elite Beat Agents, but its ostensibly simple mechanics give it a sense of purity that a lot of games lack."  The A.V. Club gave it a B and called it "the cutest drum machine on the market."

As of 11 January 2009, Rhythm Heaven had sold 1,568,000 copies in Japan. It was also the sixth best-selling game in Japan in 2008.

Sequels and legacy
A Rhythm Heaven Wii game, Rhythm Heaven Fever, succeeded this version; Nintendo president Satoru Iwata  saw potential in the game in people's living rooms. He replied: "When you see others play with the game and notice that he or she misses out on being perfectly in rhythm, it can also be surprisingly fun."

Six years later, another Rhythm Heaven game was released for the Nintendo 3DS under the title of Rhythm Heaven Megamix. It features games from the DS installment, as well as rhythm games from Fever and the original Rhythm Tengoku along with brand-new ones such as Pajama Party, Blue Bear, Tongue Lashing etc. (as well as newer variants of older ones, such as Super Samurai Slice, Karate Man Senior, and Cosmic Rhythm Rally).

Rhythm Heaven also gets referenced frequently in the WarioWare and Super Smash Bros. series.

In April 2010, THQ released a game with similar controls to Rhythm Heaven called Beat City.

Notes

References

External links
Official website 

Rhythm Heaven
2008 video games
Nintendo DS games
Nintendo DS-only games
Nintendo Research & Development 1 games
Touch! Generations
Video game sequels
Video games developed in Japan
Music video games